Emergencybnb was a website that aimed at helping vulnerable segments in society find free temporary lodging offered by their neighbors. A test version of the website was published in March 2016, with a catchphrase that read: "Host a refugee or a victim of domestic violence". Due to low traction at its infancy stage, the founder, a Harvard University graduate, resorted to listing his own Washington, D.C. apartment on Airbnb and reimbursed the guests in cash upon arrival. The website has gained media attention and was featured in a number of news portals.

EmergencyBnB has partnered with various organizations helping refugees, domestic violence victims, and trafficking victims around the world.

CNN referred to Emergencybnb as "An army of people who keep their homes and hearts open in case another person needs to walk through".

References

Citations

Other
 Alfarone, Debra. "D.C. man offers up apartment to refugees", WUSA9, Washington, D.C., 22 August 2016.
 Blake, Paul. "EmergencyBnB Aims to Bring Sharing Economy to World's Most Vulnerable", ABC News, New York, NY, 22 August 2016.
 Bliss, Laura. "A Man in Washington, D.C., Is Hosting Refugees Through Airbnb", CityLab, Washington, D.C., 23 June 2016.
 Brenner, Julia. "EmergencyBnB: An Altruistic Spin on Airbnb", Apartment Therapy, Chicago, IL, 10 June 2017.
 Bylander, Erin. "Want to put your apartment on Airbnb? Here's what you need to know first.", The Washington Post, Washington, D.C., 29 July 2016.
 DeChalus, Camila. "An Airbnb for those who need it the most", CNN, Washington, D.C., 21 October 2016.
 Epstein, Annie. "Can Technology Solve the Refugee Crisis?", Free Enterprise, Washington, D.C., 21 September 2016.
 Frankel, Jillian. "Housing Refugees Could Be as Easy as Tweaking Airbnb", TakePart, Los Angeles, California, 27 June 2016.
 Guy-Ryan, Jessie. "Syrian Refugees List Their Campsite on Airbnb", AtlasObscura, Brooklyn, NY, 26 June 2016.
 Hassanein, Rokia. "D.C. Innovator Hosts Refugees and Domestic Violence Victims for Free", StreetSense, Washington, DC, 15 August 2016.
 Hawkins, Paul. "Inspired by Airbnb: Matching refugees with hosts", BBC, London, UK, 29 August 2016.
 Neo, Perpetua. "Want to leave your abuser but fear homelessness? EmergencyBnB is your lifeline.", Huffington Post , London, UK, 20 June 2017.
 Stein, Perry. "This man launched a website so people can invite refugees to stay in their homes", The Washington Post, Washington, DC, 25 August 2016.
 Stein, Perry. "Man launches Airbnb-style website to provide free accommodation for refugees", The Independent, London, UK, 28 August 2016.
 Szink, Emily. "EmergencyBnB: Providing safe place for refugees and victims of domestic violence", KMTV, Omaha, Neb, 2 February 2017.
 Wanshel, Elyse. "This Man Made An Airbnb For Refugees Looking For A Place To Stay", Huffington Post, New York, NY, 30 August 2016.

External links

American websites
Refugee aid organizations in the United States
Internet properties established in 2016